Katarina Mazetti (born 29 April 1944 in Stockholm) is a Swedish author and journalist. She made her debut as a writer in 1988 with the picture book "Här kommer tjocka släkten!". She worked as a producer and presenter at Sveriges Radio between 1989–2004.

Bibliography
 Här kommer tjocka släkten (1988)
 Grod Jul på Näsbrännan eller Skuggan av en gris (1993)
 Handbok för martyrer (1993)
 Köttvars trollformler (1991)
 Det är slut mellan Gud och mej (1995)
 Det är slut mellan Rödluvan och vargen (1998)
 Den hungriga handväskan (1998)
 Grabben i graven bredvid (1999)
 Krigshjältar och konduktörer (1999)
 Mazettis blandning (2001)
 Fjärrkontrolleriet: äventyrs- och kärlekshistoria för barn (2001)
 Slutet är bara början (2002)
 Tyst! Du är död! (2001)
 Tarzans tårar (2003)
 Mazettis nya blandning (2004)
 Familjegraven: en fortsättning på romanen Grabben i graven bredvid (2005)
 Ottos äventyr (2005)
 Mitt himmelska kramdjur (2007)
 Slump (2008)
 Blandat blod (2008)
 Mitt liv som pingvin (2008)

References

External links
katarinamazetti.com
Katarina Mazetti in LIBRIS

1944 births
Living people
Writers from Stockholm
Swedish-language writers
Swedish children's writers
Swedish women children's writers
Swedish radio personalities
Swedish women radio presenters